Heraklas was a Greek physician of the 1st century AD whose descriptions of surgeons' knots and slings are preserved in book 48 of Oribasius' Medical Collections (Ἰατρικαὶ Συναγωγαί, Iatrikai Synagogai) under the title From Heraklas.

Describing them in detail, Heraklas discussed 16 different knots and slings, including the earliest known written account of a string figure.  Accompanying illustrations of the knots were added later by Renaissance copyists, but modern analysis of the writings by knot experts has shown many of these early drawings to contain significant errors or misinterpretations.

The knots identified
The current understanding of Heraklas' knots results primarily from analysis and identification by Hjalmar Öhrvall, Lawrence G. Miller, and Cyrus L. Day, although slightly differing interpretations and refinements continue to be made.   The table below shows the knots believed to have been described by Heraklas.

See also
 Medicine in ancient Greece

Notes and references 

Knots
1st-century Greek physicians
String figures
1st-century writers